ADAMTS-4 endopeptidase (aggrecanase-1) is an enzyme. This enzyme catalyses the following chemical reaction

 Glutamyl endopeptidase; bonds cleaved include -Thr-Glu-Gly-Glu373-Ala-Arg-Gly-Ser- in the interglobular domain of mammalian aggrecan

This enzyme belongs to the peptidase family M12.

References

External links 
 

EC 3.4.24